Harry Fry (born 18 December 1986) is a British racehorse trainer specialising in National Hunt racing. Fry has trained from stables at Corscombe in Dorset since 2020, having previously been based at Seaborough in Dorset since taking out a trainer's licence in October 2012.

Fry has trained 2 winners at the Cheltenham Festival, Unowhatimeanharry and Love Envoi.

Prior to this he trained from the same stables but the licence was held by Paul Nicholls. Fry trained Rock On Ruby to win the 2012 Champion Hurdle but the victory was credited to Nicholls as the official trainer.

Cheltenham winners (2)
 Albert Bartlett Novices' Hurdle - (1) - Unowhatimeanharry (2016)
 Dawn Run Mares' Novices' Hurdle - (1)  Love Envoi (2022)

 Major wins 
 Great Britain
 Liverpool Hurdle - (1) - If The Cap Fits (2019) Long Walk Hurdle - (1) - Unowhatimeanharry (2016) Tolworth Novices' Hurdle - (1) -  Metier (2021)  Ireland
 Champion Stayers Hurdle - (2) - Unowhatimeanharry (2017, 2019) Mares Novice Hurdle Championship Final - (1) - Bitofapuzzle (2015)''

References

External links 
 Harry Fry Racing - official website

1986 births
Living people
British racehorse trainers